The ETAP 32i is a Belgian sailboat that was designed by French designers Philippe Harlé and Alain Mortain (Harlé-Mortain), as a cruiser and first built in 1992.

Production
The design was built by ETAP Yachting in Belgium from 1992 to 2000 with about 150 boats completed, but it is now out of production.

Design
The ETAP 32i is a recreational keelboat, built predominantly of polyester glassfibre-foam cored sandwich, with wood trim. It has a 7/8 fractional sloop rig with aluminum spars, a deck-stepped mast, wire standing rigging and a single set of swept spreaders. The hull has a raked stem, a walk-through reverse transom, an internally mounted spade-type rudder controlled by a tiller and a fixed fin keel. It displaces  and carries  of ballast.

The foam-cored construction renders the boat unsinkable.

The design has sleeping accommodation for six people, with a double "V"-berth in the bow cabin, two straight settee quarter berths in the main cabin and an aft cabin with a double berth on the port side. The galley is located on the port side just forward of the companionway ladder. The galley is "L"-shaped and is equipped with a three-burner stove, a  ice box and a double sink. The head is located opposite the galley, on the starboard side and includes a shower. The main cabin has  of headroom.

Operational history
The boat was at one time supported by a class club, the ETAP Owners Association.

In a 2009 Yachting Monthly review stated, "from her short coachroof and acres of flush, TBS-covered decks and her custom deck gear, to her stainless steel and white oak-veneered interior, this Harlé Mortain model from 1993 was strikingly different from her contemporaries. Sales probably suffered as a result, though she was, and is, a very good boat in many ways. Under sail she is responsive and well mannered and capable of maintaining good average speeds. The galley is excellent but the chart table is too small. Headroom in the forward part of the saloon is too low for optimum comfort, but the all-round windows of the doghouse provide wonderful light and panoramic views. She has a large aft cabin and six berths."

See also
List of sailing boat types

References

Keelboats
1990s sailboat type designs
Sailing yachts
Sailboat type designs by Alain Mortain
Sailboat type designs by Philippe Harlé
Sailboat types built by ETAP Yachting